The 1946 Yugoslav First Basketball League season is the second season of the Yugoslav First Basketball League, the highest professional basketball league in SFR Yugoslavia.

The competition was held as an eight-team tournament held in Belgrade.

Regular season

League table

Winning Roster  
The winning roster of Crvena Zvezda:
  Nebojša Popović
  Aleksandar Gec
  Borislav Stanković
  Relja Mešterović
  Vasilije Stojković
  Rade Jovanović
  Miodrag Stefanović
  Tihomir Balubdžić
  Srđan Kalember
  Ivan Dimić
  Vladimir Banjac

Coach:  Nebojša Popović

External links  
 Yugoslav First Basketball League Archive 

1946